Lay Intellectuals in the Carolingian World is a 2007 non-fiction book edited by Patrick Wormald and Janet L. Nelson and published by Cambridge University Press.

References

2007 non-fiction books
Cambridge University Press books
English-language books